A sylph is a mythological creature in western tradition.

Sylph may also refer to:

Biology
 The hummingbird genus Aglaiocercus which includes:
 Long-tailed sylph
 Violet-tailed sylph
 Venezuelan sylph
 The skipper butterfly genus Metisella which are called sylphs
 The dragonfly genus Macrothemis which are called sylphs

Other uses
 La Sylphide, a ballet
 Sylph (1791 ship), a British merchant ship
 Sylph (1831 ship) one of two Age of Sail merchant vessels of that name
 The Sylph, a 1778 novel by Georgiana Cavendish, Duchess of Devonshire
 Sylph (Dungeons & Dragons)
 Sylph Comics, a shōjo manga publishing label under ASCII Media Works
 Sylph (magazine), a shōjo manga magazine published by ASCII Media Works

See also
 Sylpheed, an open-source e-mail client and news client licensed under the GPL